Panagiotis Tzanavaras (born 30 October 1964) is a Greek professional football manager and former player.

As a footballer, he played 16 years for Kalamata, Korinthos, Panelefsiniakos, Panafpliakos, and Olympiakos Loutraki.
He holds an UEFA Pro Coaching Licence.

References

External links
Panagiotis Tzanavaras profile at www.onsports.gr (in Greek)
Interview at www.flnews.gr (in Greek)

1964 births
Living people
Greek football managers
Super League Greece managers
Footballers from Corinth
Panelefsiniakos F.C. players
Association footballers not categorized by position
Greek footballers
P.A.S. Korinthos managers
Asteras Tripolis F.C. managers
Panachaiki F.C. managers
Rodos F.C. managers
Vyzas F.C. managers
Doxa Drama F.C. managers
Niki Volos F.C. managers
Athlitiki Enosi Larissa F.C. managers
Panegialios F.C. managers
A.E. Sparta P.A.E. managers